A vapor trail, or contrail, is a condensation trail made by the exhaust of an aircraft engine.

Vapor Trail or Vapour Trail may also refer to:

Music
 Vapor Trails, an album by Rush, or the title song, 2002
 Vapour Trails (album), by Tuxedomoon, 2007
 "Vapour Trail" (song), by Ride, 1990
 "Vapor Trail", a song by The Crystal Method from Vegas
 "Vapour Trails", a song by the Tragically Hip from Phantom Power

Other uses
 Vapor Trail (roller coaster), at Sesame Place in Langhorne, Pennsylvania, US
 Vapor Trail: Hyper Offence Formation, a 1989 video game by Data East

See also
Contrail (disambiguation)